Sinocyclocheilus guilinensis is a species of ray-finned fish in the genus Sinocyclocheilus.

References 

guilinensis
Fish described in 1985